Varreddes is a commune in the Seine-et-Marne department in the Île-de-France region in north-central France.

The American Monument, also called locally Monument de Varreddes, is located in Meaux on the road to Varreddes. The memorial includes La Liberté éplorée ("The Tearful Liberty"), a large figure by American sculptor Frederick William MacMonnies.

Demographics
Inhabitants of Varreddes are called Ravetons.

See also
Communes of the Seine-et-Marne department

References

External links

Communes of Seine-et-Marne